Caribou Municipal Airport  is a general aviation airport located 1 mile (2 km) northwest of the city of Caribou in Aroostook County, Maine, USA.

The airport is owned by the city of Caribou and was established in 1929.

Facilities 
 Runway 1/19: 4,003 x 100 ft (1,220 x 30 m), Surface: Asphalt
 Runway 11/29: 3,017 x 75 ft (920 x 23 m), Surface: Asphalt

References

External links 

Airports in Aroostook County, Maine
Caribou, Maine